Yadanabon was one of the two queens consort of King Thihathu of Pinya. She was also the mother of kings Saw Yun and Tarabya I of Sagaing.

The queen was a commoner from a small village called Linyin, located somewhere in the north. She may have been an ethnic Shan. In 1298, she was a widow with a 1-year-old child travelling south when she met Thihathu, who was on a hunting trip. Thihathu, who had just founded the Myinsaing Kingdom with his two elder brothers, took her as a concubine. She gave birth to his first male child, Saw Yun, a year later. She remained a concubine until after she gave birth to a daughter, Saw Pale. She was raised to be the Queen of the Northern Palace.

The queen's descendants include kings of Sagaing from Saw Yun to Tarabya II, as well as King Thado Minbya, the founder of Ava Kingdom. Furthermore, chief queens consorts of Ava Shin Bo-Me and Shin Myat Hla were her descendants.

Notes

References

Bibliography
 
 
 

Queens consort of Pinya
13th-century Burmese women
14th-century Burmese women
14th-century Tai people
13th-century Tai people